New Ideas for Monaco (NIM),  is a Monegasque association and political list. It ran in the 2023 election, led by councilor Daniel Boéri, but did not win any seats.

History 
In July 2022, Daniel Boéri left the Priorité Monaco party.

On 26 October 2022, it became known that the NIM association was preparing its list for participation in the 2023 elections, which would oppose the ruling Monegasque National Union.

On 16 January 2023, the list presented its 13 candidates for the 2023 election.

Ideology 
Environmental, social and democratic issues in Monaco are central to the organization.

References 

Political parties established in 2023